Shahbaz Khan Mosque is a historic mosque located in Dhaka, Bangladesh. Located near Mir Jumla’s Gate, this mosque serves as an example of late Mughal architecture in Bengal, known as the Shaista Khan architectural style.

History
The mosque and the adjacent shrine were built in 1679 AD by Hazi Khwaja Shahbaz Khan, an affluent merchant from Dhaka, who was buried in the shrine after his death.

Architecture
The mosque is rectangular and divided into three equal interior sections, each of which is roofed over by an onion dome. The eastern façade of the mosque has three arched openings, and the northern and southern façades have single-arched openings leading to the prayer hall. The prayer hall houses three semi-octagonal mihrabs, each aligned with one opening through the eastern façade. The central mihrab is larger and highly ornamented with Cyprus-filled kanjuras (decorative merlons), ornate arabesque plastic relief on the spandrels, a cusped arch, and engaged colonettes standing on bulbous floral bases. At the four corners, there are four ribbed, octagonal turrets, capped with plastered cupolas. 

In 1950, the Eastern circle of the Pakistan Directorate of Archaeology (DOA) took over the mosque for restoration.

Gallery

See also
 List of archaeological sites in Bangladesh

References

Further reading

 The Islamic Heritage of Bengal, UNESCO,
 Mahbubur Rahman "City of an architect ’, Delivistaa Foundation, 2011
 Mahfuzal Haque and Zahirul Haque 2006. "Tourist Attractions of Bangladesh", External Publicity Wing, Ministry of Foreign Affairs, Government of Bangladesh
“Khwaja Shahbaz Tomb.” Archnet, archnet.org/sites/15897.

Mosques in Dhaka
Religious buildings and structures completed in 1679